Kasturba Hospital is a government hospital situated at Chinchpokli in Mumbai. It is funded by the Municipal corporation of Greater Mumbai and is one of the centres for coronavirus testing in Mumbai.

References

Hospitals in Mumbai
Year of establishment missing